Ieva Kubliņa (born 8 July 1982) is a Latvian women's basketball player. She last played in Euroleague Women for Turkish powerhouse Fenerbahçe Istanbul. She competed with Latvia women's national basketball team at the 2008 Summer Olympics, where she scored 47 points in 5 games, including 18 in a loss to South Korea. She played college basketball at Virginia Tech, in Blacksburg, VA. Her accomplishments led to her enshrinement in the Virginia Tech Sports Hall of Fame.

Virginia Tech statistics

Source

Career
 TTT Rapa (1997-00)
Latvian Championship: 1999
 Virginia Tech (2000–04)
 DKSK Miskolc (2004)
 Lietuvos Telekomas (2004–06)
Lithuanian Championship: 2005, 2006
 USO Mondeville (2006–07)
 Dynamo Moscow (2007–08)
 TTT Riga (2008–09)
 USK Praha (2009–10)
 Seat Lami-Véd Győr (2010–11)
 CJM Bourges Basket (2011–12)
Ligue Féminine de Basketball: 2012
 Seat Lami-Véd Győr (2012–13)
 Fenerbahçe Istanbul (2013)
Turkish Women's Basketball League: 2012-13
 PEAC-Pécs (2013–14)

References

External links
 
 
 
 
 

1982 births
Living people
Basketball players at the 2008 Summer Olympics
Centers (basketball)
Fenerbahçe women's basketball players
Indiana Fever draft picks
Latvian expatriate basketball people in the United States
Latvian women's basketball players
Olympic basketball players of Latvia
Power forwards (basketball)
Basketball players from Riga
Virginia Tech Hokies women's basketball players